"I Feel Free" is a song first recorded by the British rock band Cream. The lyrics were written by Pete Brown, with the music by Jack Bruce. The song showcases the band's musical diversity, effectively combining blues rock with psychedelic pop.

"I Feel Free" was released in the UK by Reaction Records as the group's second single and reached number 11 on the singles chart. In the US, Atco Records issued it as their debut single as well as the opening track on the group's first album, Fresh Cream (1966).

Background
"I Feel Free" was recorded in September 1966 at Ryemuse Studios. The song was recorded on an Ampex reel-to-reel audio tape recorder by Robert Stigwood and John Timperley. Stigwood made the decision to omit the song on the British release of Fresh Cream, and instead released it as a single.

Charts
"I Feel Free" first entered the UK Singles Chart on 17 December 1966 at number 50, hit its highest position on 28 January 1967 at number 11, and was last seen on 4 March 1967 at number 49; the song spent a total of 12 weeks on the charts. In the US the single reached number 116 on the Billboard Bubbling Under Hot 100 Singles chart in December 1967. In Finland it reached number 39.

Personnel
 Ginger Bakerdrums, percussion
 Jack Brucelead and backing vocals, bass guitar, piano
 Eric Claptonguitar

Cover versions
In 1984, a version by Mark King of Level 42 was featured on his solo album Influences. This was released as a single and reached number 96 in the UK.

In 1986, a solo version by Jack Bruce was featured on a Renault 21 commercial and became his only solo UK hit, appearing for only one week at 95.

In 1987, American singer Belinda Carlisle recorded the song for her second studio album, Heaven on Earth (1987). The recording was produced by Rick Nowels. It was the fourth single released from the album, only released in the US. It peaked at number 88 on the US Billboard Hot 100. The 7-inch single's B-side was "Should I Let You In?", while the 12-inch single includes an extended mix and a dub version. The extended version of the song was used in the 1988 film License to Drive. An accompanying music video using concert footage was produced to promote the single.

In 1993, a version by David Bowie appeared on the album Black Tie White Noise. Bowie cited a connection with his step-brother, who was the subject of a different song on the album, as his reason for including the cover on the album.

References

External links
 

1966 singles
1986 singles
1988 singles
Cream (band) songs
Belinda Carlisle songs
David Bowie songs
Songs written by Jack Bruce
Song recordings produced by Robert Stigwood
Polydor Records singles
Atco Records singles
Psychedelic pop songs
MCA Records singles
Reaction Records singles
1966 songs
Songs with lyrics by Pete Brown